The Battle of Manners Street refers to a riot involving American servicemen and New Zealand servicemen and civilians outside the Allied Services Club in Manners Street, Te Aro, Wellington in 1943. The club was a social centre, open to all military personnel.

Background

In 1942–44 there were anywhere between 15,000 and 45,000 American servicemen stationed in New Zealand, most camped around major urban centres of the country. While New Zealand was then an isolated country with 1.6 million inhabitants, many of the American servicemen were coming from major American urban centres to New Zealand.

Riot

Some American servicemen in the Services Club objected to Māori soldiers also using the Club, and on 3 April 1943 began stopping Māori soldiers from entering. Many New Zealand soldiers in the area, both white (Pākehā) and Māori, combined in opposition. The stand-off escalated when Americans took off their belts to attack those who wanted to let the Māori in. Fights broke out and at one point at least a thousand servicemen, as well as several hundreds of civilians, were involved in the subsequent fracas, which was broken up by civil and military police. The major brawl lasted from 6 pm to 8 pm, with some brawls lasting for perhaps another two hours. Dozens of people were injured. The fighting spread to the ANA (Army, Navy and Air Force) Club in Willis Street and to Cuba Street. At the time, hotel bars closed at 6 pm, the six o'clock swill, and inebriated patrons were then ejected into the streets.

News of the riot was censored at the time, hence much of the mythology about the event, including the claim that two Americans were killed remain hard to verify. Twenty years after the riot, the finding of the Court of Inquiry was released.

Other riots

Around the same time as the Battle of Manners Street a similar riot between American and New Zealand service men was taking place in Auckland and one month later during the Mayfair Cabaret, in Cuba Street, Wellington, on 12 May 1945 another riot took place. Later in October a group of American servicemen and Māori civilians came to blows at Ōtaki in October 1943.

See also
The Battle of Brisbane, a similar riot in Australia, 1942
Zoot Suit Riots in 1943 in Los Angeles
Battle of Bamber Bridge, a similar riot in England, June 1943

Bibliography

Notes

References
 - Total pages: 191

The Yanks are Coming: The American Invasion of New Zealand 1942-1944 by Harry Bioletti (1989, Century Hutchinson, Auckland) 
United States Forces in New Zealand 1942-1945 by Denys Bevan (1992, Macpherson Publishing, Alexandra) 

1943 in New Zealand
Race relations in New Zealand
Manners Street
Race riots
1943 riots
History of the Wellington Region
Riots and civil disorder in New Zealand
Wellington City
April 1943 events
Military discipline and World War II
Racism in New Zealand